Mount Geryon is a mountain in the Central Highlands region of the Australian state of Tasmania. The mountain is part of the Du Cane Range and is situated within the Cradle Mountain-Lake St Clair National Park.

The mountain is a major feature of the national park, and is a popular venue with bushwalkers and mountain climbers.

There is a famous nearby tarn which is known as the Pool of Memories.

See also

 List of highest mountains of Tasmania

References

External links
 Parks Tasmania
 

Geryon
Geryon, Mount
Geryon, Mount